Woodhaven is a city in Wayne County, Michigan, United States.  As of the 2010 census, the city had a population of 12,875. It is part of a collection of communities known as Downriver.

Geography

Woodhaven has two ZIP Codes. One (48183) covers the majority of the city, as well as Trenton and portions of Brownstown Township. The other ZIP Code (48134) includes a small portion of the southwest corner of Woodhaven and is shared with Flat Rock.

Demographics

2010 census
As of the census of 2010, there were 12,875 people, 5,159 households, and 3,535 families residing in the city. The racial makeup of the city was 88.9% White, 5.3% African American, 0.3% Native American, 2.3% Asian, 1.3% from other races, and 1.9% from two or more races. Hispanic or Latino of any race were 5.5% of the population.

There were 5,159 households, of which 30.8% had children under the age of 18 living with them, 52.8% were married couples living together, 11.0% had a female householder with no husband present, 4.7% had a male householder with no wife present, and 31.5% were non-families. 26.4% of all households were made up of individuals, and 6.5% had someone living alone who was 65 years of age or older. The average household size was 2.46 and the average family size was 3.00.

The median age in the city was 40.3 years. 22.3% of residents were under the age of 18; 8.7% were between the ages of 18 and 24; 25.7% were from 25 to 44; 31.4% were from 45 to 64; and 11.9% were 65 years of age or older. The gender makeup of the city was 49.5% male and 50.5% female.

2000 census
As of the census of 2000, there were 12,530 people, 4,708 households, and 3,436 families residing in the city. The racial makeup of the city was 93.22% White, 2.33% African American, 0.49% Native American, 1.64% Asian, 0.02% Pacific Islander, 0.84% from other races, and 1.48% from two or more races. Hispanic or Latino of any race were 3.46% of the population.

There were 4,708 households, out of which 35.0% had children under the age of 18 living with them, 60.3% were married couples living together, 9.4% had a female householder with no husband present, and 27.0% were non-families. 22.5% of all households were made up of individuals, and 3.9% had someone living alone who was 65 years of age or older.  The average household size was 2.63 and the average family size was 3.11.

In the city, the population was spread out, with 24.6% under the age of 18, 10.0% from 18 to 24, 30.0% from 25 to 44, 28.5% from 45 to 64, and 7.0% who were 65 years of age or older.  The median age was 36 years. For every 100 females, there were 97.0 males.  For every 100 females age 18 and over, there were 94.2 males.

The median income for a household in the city was $64,954, and the median income for a family was $75,813. Males had a median income of $52,584 versus $32,742 for females. The per capita income for the city was $27,759.  About 1.5% of families and 3.3% of the population were below the poverty line, including 2.8% of those under age 18 and 3.2% of those age 65 or over.

Education
Woodhaven-Brownstown School District serves most of Woodhaven, while the southernmost portion of the city is served by Gibraltar School District.

Highways
 runs north–south through the center of Woodhaven
 was a U.S. highway that was decommissioned in 1973.  It ran along the current Dix–Toledo Road, which runs through a small portion of the city's northwest corner.
 touches along the far southeastern corner but does not actually run through the city

Notable Locations
Woodhaven is known as home to the Ford Stamping Plant.

References

External links

 City of Woodhaven official website

Cities in Wayne County, Michigan
Metro Detroit
Populated places established in 1961
1965 establishments in Michigan